Remigius Machura (born 3 July 1960 in Rychnov nad Kněžnou) is a retired shot putter who represented Czechoslovakia. His career highlights include a bronze medal at the first World Championships and a gold medal at the first World Indoor Championships. He also represented his country at the 1988 Summer Olympics where he finished fifth. His personal best put of 21.93 metres puts him 20th in the all-time performers list and he remains the Czech record holder in the event indoors and outdoors.

He was banned from the sport for life in 1985 for using Stanozolol, but this ruling was overturned just two years later. After retirement, Machura openly admitted to using banned substances throughout his career. In 2000, an investigation headed by Dr. Jan Hnizdil revealed a secret state-sponsored doping programme in 1980s Czechoslovakia. Elite athletes were forced into doping, known as the "Program of Specialized Care", and Machura acknowledged that he had been a participant and claimed a number of other prominent Czechoslovakian athletes were also involved.

Machura has a son, also named Remigius Machura, who is a shot putter as well. In September 2010 he got 2-year doping ban.

International competitions

See also
List of doping cases in athletics

References

External links

1960 births
Living people
People from Rychnov nad Kněžnou
Czechoslovak male shot putters
Czech male shot putters
Olympic athletes of Czechoslovakia
Athletes (track and field) at the 1988 Summer Olympics
World Athletics Championships athletes for Czechoslovakia
World Athletics Championships medalists
European Athletics Championships medalists
Doping cases in athletics
Czech sportspeople in doping cases
Universiade medalists in athletics (track and field)
Universiade gold medalists for Czechoslovakia
World Athletics Indoor Championships winners
Medalists at the 1985 Summer Universiade
Sportspeople from the Hradec Králové Region